Ferit Tüzün (24 April 1929, Istanbul – 21 October 1977, Ankara) was a Turkish composer. His works included the opera Midas'ın Kulakları (King Midas' Ears), on the tale of King Midas' ears.

References

Turkish composers
1929 births
1977 deaths
Musicians from Istanbul
Burials at Karşıyaka Cemetery, Ankara
20th-century composers